Phymorhynchus oculatus is a species of sea snail, a marine gastropod mollusk in the family Raphitomidae.

Description

Distribution
This marine species was found on a hydrothermal vent in the Manus Back-Arc Basin, Papua New Guinea

References

External links
 Zhang S.-Q. [Shuqian] & Zhang S.-P. [Suping]. (2017). A new species of the genus Phymorhynchus (Neogastropoda: Raphitomidae) from a hydrothermal vent in the Manus Back-Arc Basin. Zootaxa. 4300(3): 441–444
 

oculatus
Gastropods described in 2017